Ruth Marcus may refer to:

Ruth Barcan Marcus (1921–2012), philosopher and logician
Ruth Marcus (journalist) (born 1958), opinion columnist for the Washington Post